Osem Investments Ltd. is one of the largest food manufacturers and distributors in Israel. The group is owned (100%) by Nestlé S.A. of Switzerland.

Before it was acquired by Nestlé, the company was publicly traded and listed on the Tel Aviv Stock Exchange. It was a constituent of the TA-25 Index.

History

In 1942, Eugen Propper and his partner merged  Hadagan with two other factories, Assisit and Itrit,  to create Osem. The name is taken from an ancient Jewish prayer.

In 1946, the company built its first factory in Bnei Brak, producing noodles. Seven years later, in 1953, upon a request by Israel's first prime minister, David Ben-Gurion, the company added its staple "rice-substitute" product ptitim. In 1964, Osem's snack factory was founded in Holon, and the company's main product was created - the peanut butter-flavoured Bamba. In 1970, the company started producing baked food in addition to introducing the Bissli snacks, which come in several flavours such as falafel, mesquite, BBQ, pizza, and onion. Osem also produces soup powders and markets MSG-free versions of its soup mixes under a green label as opposed to the traditional red one.

The company's main factory was built in 1976 in Petah Tikva, in which the company's administration offices, distribution centre, and the sauce factory are now found.

Osem has acquired several smaller food companies and expanded their product lines, such as Froumine, Argal Bakery Shop, and Magdanot HaBait factory (where the cakes production line is found).

Other products manufactured by Osem are Cheerios breakfast cereal and hummus.

In 1995, Osem began to market Nestlé's products such as coffee, chocolate, and breakfast cereals. That year, Nestlé acquired 10% of Osem's shares, followed by an additional 41% in 1997.

All Osem products produced in Israel are produced under the kosher supervision of the Chief Rabbinate of Israel, and many are certified by the Edah HaChareidis.

Production facilities and subsidiaries

The company, formerly known as Osem Ltd, holds a number of subsidiaries which make up the Osem Group. The company's subsidiaries include Sabra Salads, Tivall, Of Tov, Nestlé Ice Creams, Beit Hashita, Asamim, Nestlé-Purina, Materna Ltd. (51%), and Foodtec. In 2008, the company bought Tribe Mediterranean Foods Ltd., a Mediterranean food producer and distributor based in the United States. The group produces approximately 2,000 different products, divided into four main categories: room temperature food - snacks and pastries, room temperature food - other, chilled food, and frozen food.

The group operates 10 different production facilities in Israel, and distributes its produce through its distribution centers. In 2007, the group completed the construction of a nationwide distribution and logistics center. In addition, the group exports its produce to Europe and the United States through its overseas subsidiaries: Osem U.K. Ltd. and Osem USA Inc.

References

External links 

  (in English, archived)

Food and drink companies of Israel
Israeli brands
Nestlé
Companies based in Petah Tikva
Companies listed on the Tel Aviv Stock Exchange
Food and drink companies established in 1942
1942 establishments in Mandatory Palestine